Parallel is the eleventh studio album by British electronic musician Four Tet, released on 25 December 2020 by Text Records. It was released the day after 871, issued under Hebden's 00110100 01010100 alias, which collects material produced from 1995 to 1997. Several tracks on the album had been previously released by Four Tet on Bandcamp, Apple Music, and Spotify under the alternate alias of ⣎⡇ꉺლ༽இ•̛)ྀ◞ ༎ຶ ༽ৣৢ؞ৢ؞ؖ ꉺლ.

Track listing

References

Four Tet albums
Text Records albums
Albums produced by Kieran Hebden
2020 albums